The Yusheng S350 is a mid-size crossover SUV produced by Yusheng (江铃驭胜), a sub-brand of Jiangling (JMC) since 2010.

History
Originally simply called the JMC Yusheng before the name change and launch of other products under the Yusheng sub-brand,  it is Jiangling's first entry into the crossover SUV market.

The engines of the Yusheng SUV is a 2.4-litre gasoline engine producing a maximum power output of 136hp and a 2.4-litre diesel engine producing a maximum power output of 122hp mated to a 5-speed manual transmission and a 6-speed automatic transmission by ZF. 

The original JMC Yusheng received a facelift for the 2013 model year and was unveiled during the 2013 Shanghai Auto Show with the name change to Yusheng S350, officially expanding the Yusheng SUV into product series. 

The JMC Yusheng S350 received another facelift for the 2016 model year. While carrying over the original 2.0-litre diesel engine, an additional 2.0-litre GTDi gasoline engine was added to the lineup. The additional engine added for the 2016 model year was sourced from Ford and produced 205hp and 325N·m mated to a 6-speed automatic transmission.

The JMC Yusheng S350 received another facelift for the 2020 model year. Apart from the significant redesigns, the powertrain was also updated with the 2.0-litre 
gasoline engine now producing 220hp（162kW） and 350N·m while the 2.0-litre diesel engine produces 141hp（104kW）and 340N·m. Transmissions are a 6-speed manual transmission and a 8-speed automatic transmission.

Yusheng N350
The Yusheng S350 was renamed to N350 in Russia, Brazil, South Africa and some other countries. It was released in the October 2010 in foreign markets, and was the first model coming out of Jiangling Motors Co.’s (JMC’s) own passenger vehicle division.

References

External links
Official website 

Mid-size sport utility vehicles
Crossover sport utility vehicles
All-wheel-drive vehicles
Rear-wheel-drive vehicles